Tuř is a municipality and village in Jičín District in the Hradec Králové Region of the Czech Republic. It has about 100 inhabitants.

History
In 2019, the village of Hubálov, originally part of Tuř, was joined to Jičín. The transfer of the entire cadastral territory is unique in the modern history of the country.

References

Villages in Jičín District